Lockport is an unincorporated community in Henry County, Kentucky, in the United States.

History
A post office was established at Lockport in 1840, and remained in operation until it was discontinued in 1991. The community was a steamboat port near a lock and dam, hence the name.  The ZIP Code for Lockport is 40036.

References

Unincorporated communities in Henry County, Kentucky
Unincorporated communities in Kentucky